TG La7 (TeleGiornale La7) is the brand for Italian TV channel La7's news programmes. They are shown domestically on La7 several times throughout the day. It was launched in 2001.

Programme format
The programme is generally presented by a single newsreader but with additional newsreaders for the sports.

Editions and Presenters

TG LA7 07:30 (TG LA7 7.30 a.m.)

 Edgardo Gulotta
 Flavia Fratello
 Fabio Angelicchio
 Emanuela Garulli

TG LA7 13:30 (TG LA7 1.30 p.m.)

 Cristina Fantoni
 Luca Speciale
 Adriana Bellini
 Bianca Caterina Bizzarri

TG LA7 ore 20:00 (TG LA7 8 p.m.)

 Enrico Mentana
 Francesca Fanuele (week-end)
 Paolo Celata (week-end)

TG LA7 Notte (TG LA7 12 p.m.)

 Paola Mascioli
 Edoardo Soldati
 Andrea Prandi
 Paolo Stella
 Franco Rina

When there is a very important fact, this edition is almost always conducted by Enrico Mentana.

Journalists

Adalberto Baldini
Alessandra Livi
Alessandra Sardoni
Alessandro Usai
Andrea D'Orazio
Andrea Molino
Andrea Pennacchioli
Andrea Prandi
Antonella Galli
Armando Sommajuolo
Barbara Batticciotto
Bianca Caterina Bizzarri
Camilla Moreno
Cinzia Malvini
Cristina Fantoni
Damiano Ficoneri
Daniela Comirato
Daniele Maglie
Edoardo Soldati
Emanuela Garulli
Emiliano Maini
Fabio Angelicchio
Fabrizio Calia
Felicia Giudice
Filippo Barone
Filippo Pirillo
Flavia Fratello
Francesca Fanuele
Francesca Roversi
Francesca Todini
Franco Rina
Frediano Finucci
Gabriella Caimi
Gianluca Galeazzi
Guy Chiappaventi
Laura Perego
Leonardo Zellino
Leslie Guglielmetti
Lorenza Ceccarini
Lorenzo Morelli
Luca Del Re
Lucio Musolino
Manuela Ferri
Marco Ferini
Marco Fratini
Marco Guarella
Marco Lanza
Maria Covotta
Maria Rosaria Pezzuto
Martino Villosio
Massimo Mapelli
Nicolò Di Thiene
Ninfa Colasanto
Paola Mascioli
Paolo Argentini
Paolo Cecinelli
Paolo Celata
Paolo Stella
Raffaella Di Rosa
Raffaella Leone
Raniero Altavilla
Roberto Bernabai
Roberto Menichini
Rossana Russo
Rossella Matera
Silvia Brasca
Simona Buonomano
Simone Costa
Sonia Mancini
Stefano Ferrante
Tiziana Stella
Ugo Francica Nava
Umberto Nigri
Vincenzo Adornetto

See also
La7

References

External links
Official page 

Mass media in Rome
Italian television news shows
1976 Italian television series debuts
1970s Italian television series
1980s Italian television series
1990s Italian television series
2000s Italian television series
2010s Italian television series
La7 original programming